Cliff Drysdale and Roger Taylor were the defending US Open men's doubles champions, but did not defend their title.

Third-seeded Owen Davidson and John Newcombe won the title by defeating first-seeded Rod Laver and Ken Rosewall 7–5, 2–6, 7–5, 7–5 in the final.

Seeds
Some seeds received a bye into the second round.

Draw

Finals

Top half

Section 1

Section 2

Bottom half

Section 3

Section 4

References

External links
 ATP main draw
1973 US Open – Men's draws and results at the International Tennis Federation

Men's Doubles
US Open (tennis) by year – Men's doubles